Giuseppe Gatta (born 24 November 1967) is a retired Italian football goalkeeper. He previously played for Delfino Pescara 1936, U.S. Lecce, Calcio Monza, Spezia Calcio, Bellusco, Rozzato and Concorezzese.

External links 

1967 births
Sportspeople from Ancona
Delfino Pescara 1936 players
U.S. Lecce players
A.C. Monza players
Italian footballers
Living people
Serie A players
Serie B players
Association football goalkeepers
Footballers from Marche